Kolaiyuthir Kalam is a thriller novel by Sujatha. It is another interesting story featuring Ganesh-Vasanth duo. The story has many deathlike themes such as leaves falling from a tree which are contrastingly named, attracting the interest of readers. The story was written in the early 80's and involves high-tech scientific concepts which were very new to that period. It was made into a television serial and aired on Doordarshan's Podhigai channel.

Plot
Ganesh and Vasanth visit a town for legal purpose involving settling down property inheritance issue. They meet a man Kumara Vyasan, guardian of an innocent, amateur girl heir named Leena. According to the will the property cannot be divided or sold and it can be inherited only by the direct heirs at their eighteen years of age while close relatives are supposed to be guardians. While discussing, Ganesh and Vasanth are told that the legal heir girl, Leena has committed a murder by becoming a blood sucking vampire and that Kumara Vyasan has concealed the victim's body by burying it two years ago. They were also told that there is a belief in the town that, a spirit which comes once in two years will kill people. Ganesh is not willing to accept that fact, searches for a valid explanation. He along with Vasanth visits the farm at night where they see an illusion of a girl in grey color resembling Leena and some voices pointing to some names. Also many mysterious things happen at the farm house which terrorize both of them. Ganesh wanted to believe that there is no ghost but circumstances make him to slowly believe while Vasanth started to believe the fact of Spirit. Kumara Vyasan was sure that Leena commits murders under the influence of spirit. Ganesh doubts Kumara Vyasan that the incident are tricks mastered by him to eliminate Leena with motivations that he can be the heir if in case Leena dies without having children. Many murders occur during the course of investigation where Kumaravyasan is also one among victim. At a point, Ganesh and Vasanth split themselves and Ganesh tries to prove all the incidents is a science fiction made by human efforts to mislead everyone, Vasanth tries to prove everything is due to the super natural forces. Circumstances point Leena to be killer but her innocence confuses Ganesh. Meanwhile, all assumptions of science are collapsed and Ganesh starts to believe that the real explanation of all the incidents is the Spirit. What happens then? Does the spirit kills by taking revenge? Is spirit real or an illusion? Subsequent part of the story moves with the answers to these questions.

Key Characters
 Ganesh (lawyer)           -  Lawyer
 Vasanth          -  Lawyer and Junior of Ganesh
 KumaraVyasan     -  Guardian of Legal Heir
 Leena            -  Legal Heir who inherits Millions of Rupees Property
 Deepak           -  Friend later husband of Leena who arranges Ganesh and Vasanth to visit the farm
 Periya Kannu     -  Gardener of the farm
 Prof Ramabathran -  One who gives expert advice about Holography and play a vital role in the end.

Film adaptation

References

Tamil novels
Indian novels
20th-century Indian novels
Indian detective novels
Indian science fiction novels
Indian novels adapted into television shows